Kung Ayaw Mo, Huwag Mo! is a 1998 romantic-comedy and drama film released by Star Cinema directed by Jerry Lopez Sineneng. It stars Maricel Soriano, William Martinez, Jolina Magdangal, and Marvin Agustin. The film was a reunion movie of Soriano and Martinez whose tandem was first seen in the drama film Oh, My Mama! (1981) but were popularized by romantic comedy films such as Galawgaw (1982) and I Love You, I Hate You (1983). They are joined by Magdangal and Agustin, in their first full-length film together, whose tandem first appeared in the segment Tameme of the twin-bill film FLAMES: The Movie (1997), 7 months later since it was released in July. The film was initially entitled "Pag-Ibig Mo, Pag-Ibig Ko". Soriano and Magdangal also both reunited 2 years ago in Ama, Ina, Anak (1996).

According to Magdangal, her casting alongside Soriano is a dream come true especially that, aside from being a fan, Soriano was a big influence in her acting career.

Plot
Inseparable sisters Doris (Soriano) and Ditas (Magdangal) are two siblings who grew up doing everything almost everything together Doris owns a pop up restaurant and is preparing for her sister's 18th birthday debut while Ditas is looking for her date and suitor when Doris’ long lost love returns Mike (Martinez) laughter ensues after an incident at a bus ride Ditas must now have an accompanying driver through Marvin Agustin who has a deep affection but resulting in pencil case scene will Doris’ strict rules break the bond between the two siblings? Or will the love reconnect the two?

Cast

Main
 Maricel Soriano as Doris Cabantog
 William Martinez as Mike Torres
 Jolina Magdangal as Ditas Cabantog
 Marvin Agustin as Miko

Supporting
 Stella Ruiz as Yogi
 Candy Pangilinan as Cris
 John Lapus as Badang
 Mel Kimura as Lisa
 Dominic Ochoa as Chuck
 J.R. Herrera as John
 Kathleen Hermosa as Cathy
 Steven Alonso as Paul
 Rex Tanwangco as Bay
 Derek Carmona as Pangga
 CJ Tolentino as Mark
 Jimson Oropesa as Tyrone
 Dimples Romana as Bettina
 Marcus Madrigal as Steven

Soundtrack

An accompanying soundtrack album was also released on the same year by Star Music. Most notable tracks on the album were "Kung Ayaw Mo, Huwag Mo" by Rivermaya, originally included in their Atomic Bomb album from BMG Records (Pilipinas);  "Tulak Ng Bibig, Kabig Ng Dibdib", a cover of the Cinderella-original by Jolina Magdangal; "TL Ako Sa Iyo", a duet of Magdangal and Marvin Agustin which Magdangal re-recorded for her sophomore album Jolina (1999).

Track listing 
Adapted from the Kung Ayaw Mo, Huwag Mo (Original Soundtrack) liner notes.

References

External links

Star Cinema films
1998 films
Philippine romantic comedy-drama films
Films shot in Manila
Films directed by Jerry Lopez Sineneng